Maltersville is an unincorporated community in Bainbridge Township, Dubois County, in the U.S. state of Indiana.

History
Maltersville was laid out in 1867 by Mrs. Anna Barbara Malter.

Geography

References

Unincorporated communities in Dubois County, Indiana
Unincorporated communities in Indiana
Jasper, Indiana micropolitan area